Lasionycta subdita is a moth of the family Noctuidae. It is a subarctic species and is found across Labrador, Quebec and Ontario to Churchill, Manitoba on the west shore of the Hudson Bay. A disjunct population is found in the White Mountains of New Hampshire.

Adults are on wing in July.

External links
A Revision of Lasionycta Aurivillius (Lepidoptera, Noctuidae) for North America and notes on Eurasian species, with descriptions of 17 new species, 6 new subspecies, a new genus, and two new species of Tricholita Grote

Lasionycta
Moths of North America
Moths described in 1860